Little Me may refer to:

 Little Me (novel), autobiographical novel by Patrick Dennis
 Little Me (musical), 1962 musical based on the novel
 "Little Me", the musical's title song, later covered by Little Peggy March
 "Little Me" (song), 2013 song by Little Mix
 Little Me, infants' and toddlers' clothing brand by Mamiye Brothers